McKinley Mitchell (December 25, 1934 – January 18, 1986) was an American Chicago-based blues and rhythm and blues singer, who started out performing gospel music. His first recorded single was "Rock Everybody Rock" for Boxer Records in 1959. His 1962 record, "The Town I Live In", became a national R&B hit on the Chicago One-derful label. The record peaked at number 8 on the US Billboard R&B chart. In his later career Mitchell returned to Mississippi, and recorded I Won't Be Back for More in 1984.

Reviewing Mitchell's self-titled 1978 album, Robert Christgau wrote in Christgau's Record Guide (1981):

He was born in Jackson, Mississippi, and died in Chicago Heights, Illinois, from a heart attack in January 1986, at the age of 51.

Albums discography
McKinley Mitchell (1978)
I Won't Be Back for More (1984)
''The Last of McKinley Mitchell (1988)

References

External links
 McKinley Mitchell | Artists | Marmoset

1934 births
1986 deaths
American blues singers
American rhythm and blues singers
Blues musicians from Mississippi
Musicians from Jackson, Mississippi
One-derful Records artists
20th-century African-American male singers